Planica 1934 refers to a ski jumping event with national championships held on 4 February 1934 and the first international event on 25 March 1934 in Planica, Drava Banovina, Kingdom of Yugoslavia.

Schedule

1934: Snow cement invention
At the 1934 nationals championships opening event, "snow cement", a mixture of salammoniac and salt hardens snow, was used for the first time in the world by Ivan Rožman, the original hill constructor.

National championships
On 4 February 1934 Bloudkova velikanka hill was officially opened with national championships of the Kingdom of Yugoslavia. The Norwegian Jahr made the opening jump and landed at 55 meters. Franc Palme became the national champion of the Kingdom of Yugoslavia with the national record of 60 meters.

Opening competition
14:30 PM — 4 February 1934 — Two rounds — chronological order

International event
On 23 March 1934 the first training session was held before the international event.

There was a second training event on 24 March 1934 before the international competition.

On 25 March 1934 two different events were held with a total of fourteen competitors from the Kingdom of Yugoslavia, Austria and Norway. The first competition started at noon and comprised two rounds. The second competition began at 1:00 PM.

First official training
Afternoon — 23 March 1934 — order of jumps not available

Second official training
Afternoon — 24 March 1934 — order of jumps not available

International competition
12:00 PM — 25 March 1934 — Two rounds — chronological order

Non-competition event

Afternoon battle for the record jump
13:00 PM — 25 March 1934 — Two rounds — chronological order

 World record not recognized. Crash Hill record World record Fall or touch

Official results

International competition
25 March 1934

National Championships
4 February 1934

Ski jumping world records

 Not recognized. Crash at world record distance

References

1934 in Yugoslav sport
1934 in ski jumping
1934 in Slovenia
Ski jumping competitions in Yugoslavia
International sports competitions hosted by Yugoslavia
Ski jumping competitions in Slovenia
International sports competitions hosted by Slovenia